Franklin Amadeo Cisneros Duarte (born December 21, 1983 in San Salvador) is a Salvadoran judoka, who played for the half-middleweight category. He won a bronze medal for his division at the 2007 Pan American Games in Rio de Janeiro, Brazil.

Cisneros represented El Salvador at the 2008 Summer Olympics in Beijing, where he competed for the men's half-middleweight class (81 kg). He received a bye for the second preliminary round, before losing out by an ippon and a juji gatame (back-lying perpendicular armbar) to U.S. judoka and Pan American Games champion Travis Stevens.

References

External links

NBC Olympics Profile

Salvadoran male judoka
Living people
Olympic judoka of El Salvador
Judoka at the 2008 Summer Olympics
Judoka at the 2007 Pan American Games
Pan American Games bronze medalists for El Salvador
Sportspeople from San Salvador
1983 births
Pan American Games medalists in judo
Medalists at the 2007 Pan American Games